Datteln is a town in the district of Recklinghausen, in North Rhine-Westphalia, Germany. It is situated on a crossroads of four canals (Datteln-Hamm Canal, Wesel-Datteln Canal, Dortmund-Ems Canal and Rhein-Herne Canal), which makes it the biggest canal junction in the World, approx. 10 km north-east of Recklinghausen and 20 km north-west of Dortmund.

Katja Seizinger, retired ski racing champion and triple Olympic gold medalist, was born in Datteln.

Notable people
 Horst Niggemeier (1929–2000), politician, mayor of Datteln
 Reinhard Lettmann (1933–2013), bishop of Münster (1980–2008)
 Egon Ramms (born 1948), General, 2007–2010 commander at NATO
 Klaus Eberhard (born 1957), director of Sport of German Tennis Federation and former tennis player
 Ingo Anderbrügge (born 1964), football player and coach
 Katja Seizinger (born 1972), World Cup alpine ski racing champion; three times the Sportswoman of the Year
 Dunja Hayali (born 1974), journalist and television presenter
 Charlotte Becker (born 1983), cyclist
 Lukas Nottbeck (born 1988), footballer
 Sarah Petrausch (born 1990), volleyball player
 Dominik Steinmann (born 1997), darts player

Twin towns – sister cities

Datteln is twinned with:
 Cannock Chase, England, United Kingdom
 Genthin, Germany

References

Towns in North Rhine-Westphalia
Recklinghausen (district)